Galina Baksheeva defeated Katherine Chabot in the final, 6–4, 8–6 to win the girls' singles tennis title at the 1961 Wimbledon Championships.

Draw

Finals

Top half

Bottom half

References

External links

Girls' Singles
Wimbledon Championship by year – Girls' singles
Wimbledon Championships
Wimbledon Championships